Krasny Bor is the name of several inhabited localities in Russia.

Arkhangelsk Oblast
As of 2012, two rural localities in Arkhangelsk Oblast bear this name:
Krasny Bor, Pinezhsky District, Arkhangelsk Oblast, a settlement in Pinezhsky Selsoviet of Pinezhsky District
Krasny Bor, Ustyansky District, Arkhangelsk Oblast, a settlement in Chadromsky Selsoviet of Ustyansky District

Bryansk Oblast
As of 2012, five rural localities in Bryansk Oblast bear this name:
Krasny Bor, Klimovsky District, Bryansk Oblast, a settlement in Kamenskokhutorsky Rural Administrative Okrug of Klimovsky District; 
Krasny Bor, Navlinsky District, Bryansk Oblast, a settlement in Chichkovsky Rural Administrative Okrug of Navlinsky District; 
Krasny Bor, Pogarsky District, Bryansk Oblast, a settlement in Vadkovsky Rural Administrative Okrug of Pogarsky District; 
Krasny Bor, Surazhsky District, Bryansk Oblast, a settlement in Ovchinsky Rural Administrative Okrug of Surazhsky District; 
Krasny Bor, Zhukovsky District, Bryansk Oblast, a settlement in Rzhanitsky Rural Administrative Okrug of Zhukovsky District;

Kaliningrad Oblast
As of 2012, three rural localities in Kaliningrad Oblast bear this name:
Krasny Bor, Gvardeysky District, Kaliningrad Oblast, a settlement in Ozerkovsky Rural Okrug of Gvardeysky District
Krasny Bor, Ozyorsky District, Kaliningrad Oblast, a settlement in Gavrilovsky Rural Okrug of Ozyorsky District
Krasny Bor, Polessky District, Kaliningrad Oblast, a settlement in Saransky Rural Okrug of Polessky District

Kaluga Oblast
As of 2012, one rural locality in Kaluga Oblast bears this name:
Krasny Bor, Kaluga Oblast, a village in Kuybyshevsky District

Kostroma Oblast
As of 2012, one rural locality in Kostroma Oblast bears this name:
Krasny Bor, Kostroma Oblast, a settlement in Ileshevskoye Settlement of Kologrivsky District;

Kurgan Oblast
As of 2012, one rural locality in Kurgan Oblast bears this name:
Krasny Bor, Kurgan Oblast, a settlement in Vyatkinsky Selsoviet of Kargapolsky District;

Leningrad Oblast
As of 2012, five inhabited localities in Leningrad Oblast bear this name:

Urban localities
Krasny Bor, Tosnensky District, Leningrad Oblast, an urban-type settlement under the administrative jurisdiction of Krasnoborskoye Settlement Municipal Formation in Tosnensky District; 

Rural localities
Krasny Bor, Boksitogorsky District, Leningrad Oblast, a village in Radogoshchinskoye Settlement Municipal Formation of Boksitogorsky District; 
Krasny Bor, Lodeynopolsky District, Leningrad Oblast, a village in Alekhovshchinskoye Settlement Municipal Formation of Lodeynopolsky District; 
Krasny Bor, Lomonosovsky District, Leningrad Oblast, a village in Gostilitskoye Settlement Municipal Formation of Lomonosovsky District; 
Krasny Bor, Podporozhsky District, Leningrad Oblast, a village under the administrative jurisdiction of Voznesenskoye Settlement Municipal Formation in Podporozhsky District;

Nizhny Novgorod Oblast
As of 2012, two rural localities in Nizhny Novgorod Oblast bear this name:
Krasny Bor, Shatkovsky District, Nizhny Novgorod Oblast, a settlement in Krasnoborsky Selsoviet of Shatkovsky District; 
Krasny Bor, Sokolsky District, Nizhny Novgorod Oblast, a village in Mezhdurechensky Selsoviet of Sokolsky District;

Novgorod Oblast
As of 2012, two rural localities in Novgorod Oblast bear this name:
Krasny Bor, Kholmsky District, Novgorod Oblast, a village in Krasnoborskoye Settlement of Kholmsky District
Krasny Bor, Maryovsky District, Novgorod Oblast, a village in Moiseyevskoye Settlement of Maryovsky District

Pskov Oblast
As of 2012, two rural localities in Pskov Oblast bear this name:
Krasny Bor, Dnovsky District, Pskov Oblast, a village in Dnovsky District
Krasny Bor, Porkhovsky District, Pskov Oblast, a village in Porkhovsky District

Smolensk Oblast
As of 2012, one rural locality in Smolensk Oblast bears this name:
Krasny Bor, Smolensk Oblast, a village in Iozefovskoye Rural Settlement of Khislavichsky District

Sverdlovsk Oblast
As of 2012, one rural locality in Sverdlovsk Oblast bears this name:
Krasny Bor, Sverdlovsk Oblast, a settlement in Gorodishchensky Selsoviet of Baykalovsky District

Republic of Tatarstan
As of 2012, two rural localities in the Republic of Tatarstan bear this name:
Krasny Bor, Agryzsky District, Republic of Tatarstan, a selo in Agryzsky District
Krasny Bor, Nizhnekamsky District, Republic of Tatarstan, a village in Nizhnekamsky District

Tver Oblast
As of 2012, two rural localities in Tver Oblast bear this name:
Krasny Bor, Kalininsky District, Tver Oblast, a village in Kulitskoye Rural Settlement of Kalininsky District
Krasny Bor, Kashinsky District, Tver Oblast, a village in Verkhnetroitskoye Rural Settlement of Kashinsky District

Ulyanovsk Oblast
As of 2012, two rural localities in Ulyanovsk Oblast bear this name:
Krasny Bor, Kuzovatovsky District, Ulyanovsk Oblast, a settlement in Yedelevsky Rural Okrug of Kuzovatovsky District
Krasny Bor, Veshkaymsky District, Ulyanovsk Oblast, a selo under the administrative jurisdiction of Veshkaymsky Settlement Okrug in Veshkaymsky District

Vladimir Oblast
As of 2012, one rural locality in Vladimir Oblast bears this name:
Krasny Bor, Vladimir Oblast, a village in Muromsky District

Vologda Oblast
As of 2012, one rural locality in Vologda Oblast bears this name:
Krasny Bor, Vologda Oblast, a settlement in Kalininsky Selsoviet of Totemsky District

Yaroslavl Oblast
As of 2012, four rural localities in Yaroslavl Oblast bear this name:
Krasny Bor, Lyubimsky District, Yaroslavl Oblast, a village in Osetsky Rural Okrug of Lyubimsky District
Krasny Bor, Tutayevsky District, Yaroslavl Oblast, a settlement in Pomogalovsky Rural Okrug of Tutayevsky District
Krasny Bor (settlement), Pestretsovsky Rural Okrug, Yaroslavsky District, Yaroslavl Oblast, a settlement in Pestretsovsky Rural Okrug of Yaroslavsky District
Krasny Bor (village), Pestretsovsky Rural Okrug, Yaroslavsky District, Yaroslavl Oblast, a village in Pestretsovsky Rural Okrug of Yaroslavsky District